Dimbulagala Divisional Secretariat is a  Divisional Secretariat  of Polonnaruwa District, of North Central Province, Sri Lanka.

References
 Divisional Secretariats Portal

Divisional Secretariats of Polonnaruwa District